The Dallas baronetcy, of Upper Harley Street in the County of Middlesex, was a title in the Baronetage of Great Britain. It was created on 31 July 1798 for George Dallas, who had earlier been in the service of the Honourable East India Company. The title became extinct on the death of the third Baronet in 1918.

Sir Robert Dallas, Chief Justice of the Common Pleas, was the elder brother of the first Baronet.

Dallas baronets, of Harley Street (1798)
Sir George Dallas, 1st Baronet (1758–1833)
William Gemmell Dallas (1792–1799)
George Dallas (1797–1816)
Henry Dallas (1802–1830)
Sir Robert Charles Dallas, 2nd Baronet (1804–1874), educated Oriel College, Oxford, and Lincoln's Inn, was an early President of the Oxford Union and became a barrister. 
Sir George Edward Dallas, 3rd Baronet (1842–1918) Survived by his widow Felicia Mary (Lady Dallas)

References

Extinct baronetcies in the Baronetage of Great Britain